José Ingenieros (born Giuseppe Ingegnieri, April 24, 1877October 31, 1925) was an Argentine  physician, pharmacist, positivist  philosopher and essayist. 

He was born in Palermo (Italy), and graduated from the University of Buenos Aires School of Medicine in 1900. Ingenieros was philosophically influenced by Herbert Spencer and Auguste Comte, and wrote a very important philosophical and social work, "El hombre mediocre" (The Mediocre Man), in 1913. Ingenieros founded the Buenos Aires Institute of Criminology in 1907 and the Argentine Psychological Society in 1908; he was elected President of the Argentine Medical Association in 1909.

Ingenieros married Eva Rutenberg, in Lausanne, in 1914. Appointed Assistant Dean of the School of Philosophy and Letters of his alma mater, he played a prominent role in the landmark University reform in Argentina, in 1918. He resigned his academic posts in 1919 to join Claridad, a communist organization, and in 1922, formed Unión Latinoamerica, a political action committee focused on anti-imperialism. He was an active Freemason since 1898. He founded a monthly, Renovación, in 1925, but died in Buenos Aires later that year.

References

Sources 
Encyclopedia Americana (United States: Encyclopedia Americana Corporation, 1969 edition), pg 172

1877 births
1925 deaths
Argentine people of Sicilian descent
Atheist philosophers
Argentine activists
Academic staff of the University of Buenos Aires
Argentine essayists
Male essayists
Argentine male writers
Physicians from Buenos Aires
Argentine philosophers
Argentine Freemasons
Comtism
Argentine psychologists
University of Buenos Aires alumni
Burials at La Chacarita Cemetery
Italian emigrants to Argentina
Argentine communists
Argentine atheists
19th-century atheists
20th-century atheists
20th-century Argentine physicians